William Rocha Alves (born 7 May 1986) is a Brazilian professional footballer who plays as a centre-back.

Career
Born in Campinas, William Alves came through the youth system at Palmeiras. He made his senior debuts with Portuguesa Santista in 2007. Later that year, William Alves moved abroad to Japan to play for lower league club Shizuoka.

In January 2008, William Alves returned to his homeland and played for Anapolina and Tombense, before moving abroad again, this time to Serbia, joining lower league club Slavija Novi Sad. He later switched to Serbian SuperLiga side Borac Čačak in the 2009 winter transfer window. In early 2013, William Alves returned to his former club Tombense.

In the summer of 2013, William Alves signed with Hungarian side Diósgyőr. He spent two years at the club, winning the League Cup in his debut season.

Honours
Diósgyőr
 Ligakupa: 2013–14

External links
 
 
 

Associação Atlética Anapolina players
Associação Atlética Portuguesa (Santos) players
Association football defenders
Brazilian expatriate footballers
Brazilian expatriate sportspeople in Hungary
Brazilian expatriate sportspeople in Japan
Brazilian expatriate sportspeople in Serbia
Brazilian footballers
Diósgyőri VTK players
Expatriate footballers in Hungary
Expatriate footballers in Japan
Expatriate footballers in Serbia
FK Borac Čačak players
Nemzeti Bajnokság I players
Serbian First League players
Serbian SuperLiga players
Sportspeople from Campinas
Tombense Futebol Clube players
1986 births
Living people